Ahmet Burak Erdoğan (born 4 July 1979) is a Turkish businessman, the owner of MB Denizcilik, and the eldest son of Recep Tayyip Erdoğan, the President of Turkey.

Personal life
Ahmet Burak Erdoğan was born in Istanbul on 4 July 1979, the son of Recep Tayyip Erdoğan and his wife Emine Erdoğan, and educated at İmam Hatip school. He has a bachelor's degree from Istanbul Bilgi University. As with all his siblings, his higher education was paid for by Remzi Gür, a Turkish textile entrepreneur and friend of the Erdoğan family. In 1998, the Turkish classical music singer Sevim Tanürek died in Istanbul after a period in intensive care after being hit by a car driven by Erdoğan, who reportedly did not have a driving licence and fled the scene. Erdoğan ultimately received no punishment.  Following the accident involving Tanürek, he left Turkey to study economics in London.

In 2001, Erdoğan married Sema Ketenci, the daughter of Osman Ketenci.

Career
He bought a shipping company together with Mustafa Erdoğan and Ziya İlgen in 2006 and they named it Bumerz. In 2007 Erdoğan co-founded the shipping company MB Denizcilik together with Mecit Çetinkaya, who as well owns the sea freight company Manta Denizcilik. In November 2013, MB bought a sixth ship, Pretty, built in China for over $20 million and with a capacity of 91,000 tons, to add to the existing five ships, Safran 1, Sakarya, G. İnebolu, Cihan and Bosna that it owns. The acquisition of Pretty almost doubled the company's shipping capacity. In 2013, Ynetnews reported that one of MB's ships, 95-metre Safran-1 had travelled several times between Turkish and Israeli ports despite the poor relations between the two countries, and that in the Turkish Parliament, opposition MPs had asked his father: "Has your son been exempted from the trade embargo against Israel? Is it ethical? What share of the volume of trade with Israel did the ship owned by your son take?" Ynetnews noted that no formal trade embargo had existed at the time, except for arms sales.

In 2015, Aydınlık reported that Erdoğan now owned 99% of MB (with Çetinkaya owning the other 1%) and that MB owned tankers worth US$80 million.

References

1979 births
Living people
Ahmet Burak
Imam Hatip school alumni
Turkish people of Georgian descent
Turkish people of Arab descent
Businesspeople in shipping
Sons of national leaders
Businesspeople from Istanbul